The 2011 Macedonian Handball Cup was the 19th edition of the Macedonian Handball Cup. It took place at the Sports Hall Mladost in Bitola, Republic of Macedonia, on 14 and 15 May 2011. The cup was won by RK Metalurg for the fourth time.

Venue

Knockout stage

Semifinals

Final

See also
Macedonian Handball Cup

References

External links
Official website
Handball news

Handball in North Macedonia
2011 in handball